Wilhelm Johann Schlenk (22 March 1879 – 29 April 1943) was a German chemist. He was born in Munich and also studied chemistry there. Schlenk succeeded Emil Fischer at the University of Berlin in 1919.

Schlenk was an organic chemist who discovered organolithium compounds around 1917. He also investigated free radicals and carbanions and discovered (together with his son) that organomagnesium halides are capable of participating in a complex chemical equilibrium, now known as a Schlenk equilibrium.

Today Schlenk is remembered mostly for developing techniques to handle air-sensitive compounds and for his invention of the Schlenk flask.  The latter is a reaction vessel with a glass or Teflon tap for the addition and removal of gases, such as nitrogen or argon. He is also known for the Schlenk line, a double manifold incorporating a vacuum system and a gas line joined by double oblique taps that allow the user to switch between vacuum and gas for the manipulation of air-sensitive compounds.

References

Further reading

External links
 Picture of Schlenk
 The Arfvedson-Schlenk Award (in German)
 English Translation of Schlenk's 1929 German article on Grignard reagents. English title: 'On the constitution of the Grignard reagent'; German title "Über die Konstitution der Grignardschen Magnesiumverbindungen".

20th-century German chemists
1879 births
1943 deaths
Scientists from Munich
Members of the Royal Society of Sciences in Uppsala